Aenictus anceps is a species of tannish beige army ant found in Eritrea, and Sudan.

References

Dorylinae
Hymenoptera of Africa
Insects described in 1910